Katie Griggs (1979 –  August 1, 2021), professionally known as Guru Jagat, was an American Kundalini yoga teacher, podcaster, author, and the owner of both a fashion brand and record label.

She is noted for sharing QAnon conspiracy theories and interviewing conspiracy theorists on her podcast.

Early life and education 
Katie Griggs was born in the summer of 1979 in Fort Collins, Colorado. Her mother was a farmer and a therapeutic clown, and brought her up surrounded by New Age teachings.

Before adopting the Guru Jagat moniker, she also used the aliases Athena Day, Katie Day, and Kundalini Katie. After initially dropping out of school, she obtained a degree from Antioch College. She studied Kundalini yoga in New Mexico under the mentorship of Harbhajan Singh Khalsa.

Career and views 
Griggs was the owner-operator of Kundalini yoga studio the Ra Ma Institute, located on Lincoln Boulevard in Venice, Los Angeles, that opened in 2013. Her clients included actor Kate Hudson, singer Alicia Keys, and actors Kelly Rutherford, Demi Moore, and Laura Dern. Staff at the studio were paid below minimum wage. She opened her second yoga studio in Boulder, Colorado in the summer of 2014.

Griggs operated the podcast Reality Riffing with Guru Jagat. During the COVID-19 pandemic, she used her podcast to share conspiracy theories about COVID-19 being spread by chemtrails and that artificial intelligence was taking over. On the podcast she interviewed conspiracy theorist Arthur Firstenberg and conspiracy theorist and antisemite David Icke. Griggs did not follow California's public health rules during the pandemic and refused COVID-19 vaccines.

Griggs used social media to share supportive statements about her mentor, the late Harbhajan Singh Khalsa, also known as Yogi Bhajan, who was accused of rape, child abuse, and financial impropriety. Griggs also shared QAnon conspiracy theories, including the Pizzagate conspiracy theory. In 2021, two former employees of Griggs accused her of running Ra Ma Institute as a cult, and calling a Black Lives Matter supporter a "cockroach".

Griggs owned the clothing line Robotic Disaster and the record label RA MA Records.

Invincible Living (book) 
In 2017, Harper Elixir published Grigg's book Invincible Living: The Power of Yoga, The Energy of Breath and Other Tools for a Radiant Life (ISBN 978-0062414984.) Invincible Living includes lessons previously shared by Griggs via her media outlet RA MA Media on the topic of Kundalini yoga. The illustrated book includes instruction on simple breathing and moving exercises as well as lifestyle and wellness advice. The book includes advice that claims to increase metabolism, improve mood, increase creativity, reduce stress, and slow ageing. It also provides advice on financial prosperity and improving reader's sex lives.

Personal life and death 
Griggs married husband Teg Nam in a Sikh ceremony in Scotland in 2019.

Griggs died on August 1, 2021, at the age of 41. She died of a cardiac arrest caused by a pulmonary embolism following surgery her left ankle. She is buried in the Hollywood Forever Cemetery.

Legacy 
HBO Max is working on a documentary-series about her life. Laist featured Griggs in season four of their Imperfect Paradise (podcast).

See also 

 Yoga in the United States
 Sexual abuse by yoga gurus

References

External links 
 Guru Jagat – Instagram
 Guru Jagat – Twitter
 Ra Ma Yoga Institute – official website

1979 births
2021 deaths
American podcasters
American yoga teachers
American conspiracy theorists
American fashion businesspeople
People from Fort Collins, Colorado
Antioch College alumni
21st-century American women writers
QAnon
COVID-19 conspiracy theorists
American yogis
Women yogis